Christophe Bourseiller (born Christophe Gintzburger; born 27 September 1957 in Paris) is a French actor, writer, freemason and journalist. He began as a child actor and starred in Yves Robert's War of the Buttons (La Guerre des boutons) in 1962 on his debut. He made several appearances on stage in the late 1970s and early 1980s and again in 2005 and 2006.

Biography 
He was born as Christophe Gintzburger. His father, André Gintzburger called Kinsbourg (1923-2013), was a playwright and theater producer. His mother, Chantal Darget (née Marie Chantal Chauvet; 1934-1988), was an actress and the daughter of journalist Claude Darget. His mother subsequently married the director Antoine Bourseiller (of which Christophe adopts the surname as a stage name) and they had a daughter, the rejoneadora Marie Sara.

From the age of four, he appears in cinemas in War of the Buttons, the film by Yves Robert. He then played under the direction of Jean-Luc Godard, Claude Lelouch, Jacques Demy and Pierre Jolivet. It is found in the credits of about thirty films, about twenty telefilms and on the poster of several plays.

At the same time, he pursues a career as a writer, journalist, radio and television man. He has published thirty books on topics as diverse as: minority movements, political extremism, the against-culture, the industrial music and the new wave of the 1980s.

Nearly a time of milieux of extreme left, it dedicates, in 1996, a work to the French Maoists entitled The Maoists: The Folle History of the French Red Guards.

On the radio, he began by creating in 1981 the free radio Frequency arts and shows. On France Musique, he co-produced a weekly program, launched in 2005 and dedicated to avant-garde music: Electromania and animated the morning for two seasons from 2011 to 2013. On television, after having presented several programs since 1984, he becomes editorial advisor of the program Ce soir (ou jamais!) until July 2011. He also participates in a historic program L'Ombre d'un Doubt on FR3 on Wednesdays on two, hosted by the presenter Franck Ferrand.

In 2001, he published a review of studies on the Situationist International, Éditions Denoël, Archives and Situationist Documents, five issues of which will appear until 2005. In 2009, he was behind the "Who Are You? " by Bourin Éditeur.

Since 2003, he has taught at the Institut d'Etudes Politiques in Paris and at Sciences Po Lille. He is also preparing a PhD thesis at the Paris-1 Panthéon-Sorbonne University on Les Mouvements collaborationnistes français from June 1944 to December 1950 under the direction of Pascal Ory.

Since childhood, Christophe Bourseiller has been collecting leaflets and propaganda documents. He entrusted thousands to the Institute of Social History in Amsterdam. He also collects, among others, rare and newspapers [ref. Required].

In 2014, he participated in the second season of the program Les Pieds dans le plat on Europe 1 as a columnist. Since September 7, 2014, he also produces on Musique Musique the program Musicus Politicus, which deals with the links between music and politics. He is finally chronicler in La Bande originale, on France Inter.

Bibliography
 1984 : Une scène jeunesse, Éditions Autrement
 1989 : Les Ennemis du système, Éditions Robert Laffont
 1991 : Extrême Droite, l'enquête, Éditions François Bourin (Éditions du Rocher, 2002, La Nouvelle Extrême Droite)
 1993 : Les Faux Messies, Éditions Fayard
 1995 : Message Reçu, Éditions Spengler
 1995 : Mauvais Garçons (en collaboration), Éditions Spengler
 1996 : Les Maoïstes, la folle histoire des gardes rouges français, Éditions Plon
 1997 : Cet Étrange Monsieur Blondel, Éditions Bartillat
 1998 : Les Écrivains et l'engagement (en collaboration), Bibliothèque publique d'information
 1999 : Le Guide de l'Autre Paris, Éditions Bartillat
 1999 : Vie et Mort de Guy Debord, Éditions Plon (Pocket, 2002)
 2000 : Le Miracle inutile, Éditions Flammarion
 2000 : Dictionnaire du rock (en collaboration),  Éditions Robert Laffont
 2000 : Les Forcenés du désir, Éditions Denoël
 2001 : Le Guide de l'Autre Londres, Éditions Bartillat
 2002 :  (en collaboration), Böhlau Verlag
 2003 : La Véritable Histoire de Lutte ouvrière (entretiens avec Robert Barcia), Éditions Denoël
 2003 : Jacqueline de Jong, Undercover in de Kunst/in art (en collaboration), Ludion
 2003 : Fous littéraires, nouveaux chantiers(en collaboration), Du Lérot
 2003 : Histoire générale de l'ultra-gauche, Éditions Denoël
 2004 : Bibliothèque secrète, Éditions Bartillat
 2004 : Les Têtes de Turc (en collaboration), Du Lérot
 2005 : Carlos Castaneda, la vérité du mensonge, Éditions du Rocher
 2006 : L'Aventure moderne, Flammarion
 2006 : Extrêmes gauches, la tentation de la réforme, Éditions Textuel
 2008 : Génération Chaos - Punk, New Wave 1975 - 1981, Éditions Denoël
 2009 : À gauche, toute !, CNRS Éditions
 2009 : Lutte armée, Éditions du toucan
 2009 : Qui etes vous ? Antoinette Fouque (en collaboration avec Antoinette Fouque), Bourin Editeur
 2010 : Qui etes vous ? Michel Maffesoli (en collaboration avec Michel Maffesoli), Bourin Editeur
 2010 : Un Maçon franc, Éditions Alphée

Filmography 
 1976: Pardon Mon Affaire
 1979: Courage - Let's Run
 1981: Clara et les Chics Types
 1991: A Mere Mortal (Simple mortel)
 2015: The Art Dealer

References

External links
 

French journalists
French male film actors
French male stage actors
French male child actors
1957 births
Living people
French male non-fiction writers
French Freemasons
Radio France people